Route 342 in Newfoundland and Labrador leads from Route 341 in Lewisporte to Embree and then to Little Burnt Bay, all on the island of Newfoundland. The highway also acts as the main road in all three towns and links them together.

Route description

Route 342 begins as Main Street in downtown Lewisporte at an intersection with Route 341 (Main Street/Premier Drive). The highway passes by Lewisporte's Marina as it heads north along the banks of Burnt Bay through neighbourhoods before leaving Lewisporte and passing through rural areas for several kilometres. Route 342 now passes through Embree as it begins following the Bay of Exploits. The highway continues north to enter Little Burnt Bay, where Route 342 comes to a dead after passing by that town's harbour.

Major intersections

See also

List of Newfoundland and Labrador highways

References

342